Black Lake or Black Lakes may refer to:

Places

Canada
 Black Lake (Nova Scotia), several lakes

 Black Lake (Fond du Lac River, Saskatchewan)
 Black Lake Denesuline First Nation, a Denesuline First Nations band government on the northwest shore
 Black Lake, Quebec, a former city that is now part of Thetford Mines

Ontario
 Algoma District
 Black Lake (Blind River)
 Black Lake (Barager Township)
 Black Lake (LeCaron Township)
 Black Lake (Central Frontenac), Frontenac County
Haliburton County
 Black Lake (Dysart et al)
 Black Lake (Minden Hills)
Kenora District
 Black Lake (Marchington River)
 Black Lake (Sioux Narrows-Nestor Falls)
 Black Lakes (Ontario), a pair of lakes

Mongolia
 Khar Lake (Khovd)
 Khar Lake (Zavkhan)

Switzerland
 Lago Nero (Ticino) (Black Lake)
 Lai Nair, Tarasp, Grisons (Black Lake)
 Lai Neir (Alp Flix), Sur, Grisons (Black Lake)
 Lej Nair (Bernina), Pontresina, Grisons (Black Lake)
 Schwarzsee/Lac Noir (Black Lake)
 Schwarzsee (Zermatt), Valais (Black Lake)
 Schwarzsee (Oberems), Valais (Black Lake)
 Schwarzsee (Blatten), Valais (Black Lake)
 Schwarzsee (Pizol), canton of St. Gallen

United Kingdom
 Black Lake, Sandwell, in the List of areas in Sandwell, England
 Black Lake tram stop, and the surrounding area and lake
 Black Lake Nature Reserve, Cheshire, England
 Llyn Dulyn (Black Lake), Wales

United States
 Black Lake (Arkansas County, Arkansas), in List of lakes of Arkansas County, Arkansas
 Black Lake (Bradley County, Arkansas), in List of lakes in Bradley County, Arkansas
 Black Lake (Calhoun County, Arkansas), in List of lakes in Calhoun County, Arkansas
 Black Lake (Florida), in Orange County
 Black Lake (Louisiana), in Natchitoches Parish
 Black Lake (Michigan), in Cheboygan and Presque Isle counties
 Black Lake (Berrien County, Michigan)
 Black Lake (Montana), in List of lakes in Missoula County, Montana
 Black Lake (New York), in Saint Lawrence County
 Black Lake (Washington), in Thurston County

Elsewhere
 Černé jezero (Black Lake), the largest lake in the Czech Republic
 Black Lake (Kerry), a mountain pass in Ireland
 Black Lake (Montenegro)
 Black Lake (Triglav Lakes Valley) or Črno jezero, Slovenia
 Karagöl, Giresun (Black lake), Turkey

Arts and entertainment
 Black Lake, a fictional loch near Hogwarts in the Harry Potter films
 Black Lake, the home of the Old Gregg character from The Mighty Boosh BBC television show
 Black Lake, a fictional location in the TV series Twin Peaks
 Black Lake (TV series), a 2016 Swedish TV series
 "Black Lake" (Björk Song), from the album Vulnicura
 Black Lake, Maine, a fictional lake in the movie Lake Placid (film). (There is also a real Black Lake in Maine.)

See also

 Black Lakes (disambiguation)
 Lac Noir (disambiguation)
 Lago Nero (disambiguation)
 Lai Neir (disambiguation)
 Lej Nair (disambiguation)
 Schwarzer See (disambiguation)
 Schwarzsee (disambiguation)
 Svartsjön, Hanveden (Black Lake), a lake in Södermanland, Sweden
 Crna Bara (disambiguation)